El hogar que yo robé (English title: The Home I Robbed) is a Mexican telenovela produced by Valentín Pimstein for Canal de las Estrellas in 1981.

Angélica María starred has dual role as protagonist/antagonist, Juan Ferrara starred as protagonist, while Angélica Aragón starred as antagonist. Virginia Manzano, Aldo Monti and Socorro Bonilla starred as stellar performances.

Plot 
Andrea Velarde is a young married woman who cheats on her husband, she is traveling in a tourist place with Eduardo, a young gigolo and rake. Visiting a casino and after dinner, Andrea goes to touch up her makeup in the restroom, also feeling bad about something she ate, then suddenly her face is reflected in the mirror, but the image is not hers, but of another woman, surprised she discover Victoria the humble girl in charge of the vanity, also surprised by the resemblance to the rich and sophisticated woman.

Andrea conceives an idea to keep enjoying her freedom, offering Victoria money to impersonate her since they are identical and no one will notice the change. Go to the house where she lives with her husband and spend some time enjoying a life of luxuries, while Andrea travels with her lover. Horrified Victoria refuses, she tells Andrea she could not be with an unknown man. Andrea laughs saying there is no need for marital life that she can deceive her husband saying she is sick and can not have sex, that he is very understanding and won't force her.

Andrea dresses and does Victoria's hair and makes her appear before Eduardo, who does not notice that he is before another woman. That tells Andrea that her plan will succeed. She tells Victoria that she lives in a mansion with her husband Carlos Valentin, the two small children of his first marriage, his mother Doña Amanda and his siblings, Luis Felipe and Genoveva. To force Victoria's hand, Andrea accuses Victoria of stealing her diamond bracelet. With no way out Victoria agrees to Andrea's plan and goes to her home. There she starts to unravel the mess that Andrea has left behind. Victoria will help the family and the family business. Andrea will keep on been the selfish, perverted creature she has always been.

Cast 
 
Angélica María as Victoria Valdéz Roldán/Andrea Montomayor de Velarde
Juan Ferrara as Carlos Valentín Velarde
Gregorio Casal as Reynaldo
Virginia Manzano as Amanda Velarde
Angélica Aragón as Genoveva Velarde
Aldo Monti as Luis Felipe Velarde
Leonardo Daniel as Eduardo
René García as Carlitos Velarde
Maritza Olivares as Florita
María Clara Zurita as Teresa
Angélica Vale as Aurorita Velarde
Martha Verduzco as Virginia
Carmen Belén Richardson as Fernanda
Tere Mondragón as Juana
Luis Couturier as Silvestre Soler
Arturo Guízar as Isidoro
Arturo Lorca as Cabrera
Socorro Bonilla as Diana
Luciano Hernández de la Vega as Ballesteros
Mauricio Ferrari as Luigi
Eugenio Cobo as Karim Saud
Sanicte Maldonado as Aixa
Felicia Mercado as Flor
Lili Inclán as Crisanta
Mónica Prado as Verónica
Ada Carrasco as La Coronela
Lola Tinoco as Rosarito
Marina Dorell as Marilola
Violet Gabriel
Saby Kamalich as Jimena Fuentes
Xavier Marc as Adrián Montemayor
Arturo García Tenorio as Salomon
Edith González as Paulina
Alejandro Tommasi as Daniel
Alma Delfina as Carmita
Leticia Perdigón
Fernando Borges as Tte.Sagredo
Celeste Sáenz as Odalisque Ballarina
Armando Calvo as Gaspar Garay
Eduardo Yáñez as Barman
Jacarandá Alfaro as Odalisque
Estela Correa as Deren, Odalisque
Héctor Cruz as Commissar Rivarola
Rebeca Rambal as Mariquita
Félix Santaella as Doctor
Alfonso Iturralde as Lisandro/Rodrigo Montemayor
Beatriz Aguirre as Janina
Socorro Avelar
Alberto Gavira as Eleuterio
Tere Cornejo as Nurse
Aurora Cortes
Enrique Gilabert as Apoderado de Karim
Juan Pelaez as Braulio

References

External links 

Mexican telenovelas
1981 telenovelas
Televisa telenovelas
1981 Mexican television series debuts
1981 Mexican television series endings
Spanish-language telenovelas